James P. Carse (December 24, 1932 – September 25, 2020) was  an American academic who was Professor Emeritus of history and literature of religion at New York University. His book Finite and Infinite Games was widely influential. He was religious "in the sense that I am endlessly fascinated with the unknowability of what it means to be human, to exist at all."

Carse's recent work on religion and belief provides a foil to New Atheism.  His ideas about religion and belief were featured on the May 4, 2012 CBC Radio series Ideas titled After Atheism: New Perspectives on God and Religion, Part 4.

His novel PhDeath: The Puzzler Murders was published in the fall of 2016.

Books 
 Jonathan Edwards & The Visibility of God. Charles Scribner's Sons, 1967
 Death and Existence: A Conceptual History of Human Mortality 1980.
 The Silence of God: Meditations on Prayer (excerpt) 1985.
 Finite and Infinite Games. New York: Ballantine Books .  1987.
 Breakfast at the Victory 1994.
 The Gospel of the Beloved Disciple 1997.
 The Religious Case Against Belief. 2008. New York: The Penguin Press 
 PhDeath: The Puzzler Murders. 2016. New York. Opus Press  978-1-62316-066-1

Audio Seminars 
 Religious War In Light of the Infinite Game
 Carse on the Paula Gordon Show

References

2020 deaths
American religious writers
Religious studies scholars
New York University faculty
1932 births